Mars Entertainment Group is a Turkish cinema operator. Its cinema chain brand Paribu Cineverse has over 50% of the market share by box office gross and over 500 screens in the country. It's owned by CJ CGV.

External links

References

Cinema chains in Turkey
Mass media companies established in 2001
CJ Group subsidiaries
Turkish companies established in 2001
CJ CGV